Masque is the third studio album by American progressive rock band Kansas. The album was released in September 1975, remastered for CD in 2001, and again remastered and reissued on vinyl in 2014. The opening track, "It Takes a Woman's Love (To Make a Man)", was remixed for release as a single but was not popular, including additional guest vocals and segments far different from the album version.

Masque peaked at #70 on the Billboard album chart, and approximately 250,000 units were sold within months. Each of Kansas's first three album releases had new commercial interest with certified Gold sales of 500,000 units (Masque in December 1977) due to the platinum success of the fourth and fifth studio albums: Leftoverture (1976) and Point of Know Return (1977).

Track listing

Personnel 
Kansas
 Steve Walsh – organ, piano, clavinet, Moog synthesizer, congas, lead and backing vocals
 Kerry Livgren – lead and rhythm guitars, acoustic guitar, piano, clavinet, Moog and ARP synthesizers
 Robby Steinhardt – violin, lead and backing vocals
 Rich Williams – lead and rhythm guitars
 Dave Hope – bass guitar
 Phil Ehart – drums, percussion

Additional musicians
 Earl Lon Price – saxophone on track 1

Production
Jeff Glixman – producer, remastered edition producer
Lee Peterzell – engineer
Jimmy Stroud – assistant engineer
Jeff Magid – remastered edition producer

Charts

Certifications

References 

Kansas (band) albums
1975 albums
Albums produced by Jeff Glixman
Epic Records albums
Albums recorded at Studio in the Country